Anderson Rafael Contreras Pérez (born Socopó, Venezuela; 30 March 2001) is a Venezuelan footballer who plays as a midfielder for Caracas.

Career
After playing for Caracas, in September 2021, he was loaned to Universidad de Chile in the Chilean Primera División on a deal until the end of the 2022 season, but in 2022 he was loaned to Audax Italiano, returning to Caracas after ending his contract with Universidad de Chile.

Career statistics

Club

Notes

Honours
Caracas
Venezuelan Primera División (1): 2019

References

External links

2001 births
Living people
People from Barinas (state)
Venezuelan footballers
Venezuelan expatriate footballers
Association football midfielders
Caracas FC players
Universidad de Chile footballers
Audax Italiano footballers
Venezuelan Primera División players
Chilean Primera División players
Expatriate footballers in Chile
Venezuelan expatriate sportspeople in Chile
21st-century Venezuelan people